often credited as Hideyuki or Yuuki Hide, was a Japanese singer best known for singing theme songs to various anime and tokusatsu shows. He died from heart failure on December 8, 1998.

Selected Discography

Anime and tokusatsu
 1972 Jinzo Ningen Kikaida

Go Go Kikaida (w/The Columbia Cradle Club) - opening theme
Fight!! Mechanical Man Kikaida (w/The Columbia Cradle Club) - ending theme

1972 Kaiketsu Lion-Maru

Oh Wind, Oh Light (w/Young Fresh) - opening theme

1972 Triton of the Sea

GO! GO! Triton - opening theme

1973 Tetsujin Taiga Sebun (Tetsujin Tiger Seven)

Iron Man Tiger Seven - opening theme

1974 Inazuman Flash

Flash! Inazuman - opening theme

1974 Ultraman Leo

Fight! Ultraman Leo (w/Youth Choir Mizumi) - 2nd opening theme

1976 Blocker Gundan IV Machine Blaster

Blocker Gundan IV Machine Blaster (w/Toei Jidou Gasshoudan) - opening theme

1978 Sutâurufu (Star Wolf (TV series))

Seishun no Tabidachi - opening theme
Sasurai no Star Wolf - ending theme

1978 Spider-Man (tokusatsu)

Run! Spider-Man - opening theme
Ballad of an Oath - ending theme

1979 Captain Future

 Yume no Funanori - Opening theme
Oira wa Sabishii Spaceman - Insert Song

TV Commercial
1973 Hitachi Tree (often called "Kono ki Nanno ki?")

Corporate commercial of Hitachi Group.

Tokusatsu
1940 births
1998 deaths
Anime musicians
20th-century Japanese male singers
20th-century Japanese singers